Roberson may refer to:

Roberson (surname)
Roberson Wine
Roberson de Arruda Alves, Brazilian footballer

See also
 Robersonville, NC
 Robertson (disambiguation)
 Robinson (disambiguation)
 Robeson (disambiguation)
 Robason
 Stokes, NC